Senator Harper may refer to:

Members of the United States Senate
Robert Goodloe Harper (1765–1825), U.S. Senator from Maryland in 1816
William Harper (South Carolina politician) (1790–1847), U.S. Senator from South Carolina in 1832

United States state senate members
Francis Jacob Harper (1800–1837), Pennsylvania State Senate
George B. Harper (1918–1988), New Jersey State Senate
Jack Harper (politician) (born 1967), Arizona State Senate
Joseph M. Harper (1787–1865), New Hampshire State Senate
Nick Harper (politician) (born 1979), Washington State Senate
Thelma Harper (politician) (1940–2021), Tennessee State Senate
Tyler Harper (born 1986), Georgia State Senate
Wayne Harper (born 1956), Utah State Senate